Ernest Stanley Hoare (21 June 1903 – 25 February 1994) was a master at Dean Close School, Cheltenham, a hockey player at the national level (England) and a cricket player at the county level (Gloucestershire).

Born in Upper Clatford, Hampshire in 1903, he was the youngest of four brothers, all of whom were educated at Dean Close School, which he entered in January 1914. He was a remarkably gifted games player. When he left in 1922 as Senior Prefect (Head of School), he had been captain of gymnastics for four years, captain of cricket and hockey each for three years and captain of football for two. He also swam for the School.

He read Mathematics and Geography at Queens' College, Cambridge. Playing at centre-half, he won Blues for hockey (1924-6) and played for England (1926–37) winning 30 caps. He captained Cambridge University and England and was the School’s first international hockey player. In 1956, when another member of staff, Denys Carnill, captained the Great Britain Olympic hockey team in Melbourne, Australia, Hoare was the coach and manager.

He made three appearances for Gloucestershire as a middle-order batsman under the great Wally Hammond’s captaincy. His first-class debut for Gloucestershire against Surrey in the 1929 County Championship was at The Oval. He made two further first-class appearances for the county in 1929: against Warwickshire at The Victoria Ground, Cheltenham, and Hampshire at the same venue.

Hoare returned to Dean Close School in 1926 as an Assistant Master. With colleagues he helped to raise the standard of games, especially hockey. Housemaster of Brook from 1936–59, he became Second Master (deputy head) from 1959-68. Hoare was modest, deeply devoted to the School and a man of integrity and faith. His work for past pupils (the Old Decanian Society) was prodigious, being an office holder in one capacity or another from 1927 to 1968. He married Joan Edwards in 1958.

When Hoare retired in 1968, he and his wife moved to Charlton Kings. He became a keen grower of roses until his death in 1994 at the age of 90. The following year a rose garden in his memory was opened at Dean Close School overlooking the artificial hockey pitches. Later, a sundial was added as a focal point, the stone carving and engraving the work of John Williams of St David’s, Pembrokeshire. The School Badge with its motto Verbum Dei Lucerna – God’s Word is a Guiding Light is on the stem of the pedestal. The inscription around the top reads: In sight of hockey and roses, remember Stanley Hoare. Brook was his love, Dean Close his life.

References

1903 births
1994 deaths
People from Test Valley
People educated at Dean Close School
Alumni of Queens' College, Cambridge
British male field hockey players
English cricketers
Gloucestershire cricketers
Sportspeople from Gloucestershire